The Longman Companions to History is a book series, published by Longman and under the editorship of Chris Cook and John Stevenson, that provides a one volume overview of a major area of historical study. The first volumes were published in 1993. The most recent volumes was published in 2004.

Titles

1990s
The Longman Companion to Britain in the Era of the Two World Wars, 1914-45. Andrew Thorpe, 1993. 
The Longman Companion to Cold War and Detente, 1941-91. John W. Young, 1993. 
The Longman Companion to Napoleonic Europe. Clive Emsley, 1993. 
The Longman Companion to European Nationalism, 1789-1920. Raymond Pearson, 1993. 
The Longman Companion to Nazi Germany. Tim Kirk, 1995. 
The Longman Companion to the Tudor Age. Rosemary O'Day, 1995. 
The Longman Companion to Britain since 1945. Chris Cook & John Stevenson, 1995. 
The Longman Companion to America in the Era of the Two World Wars, 1910-1945. Patrick Renshaw, 1996. 
The Longman Companion to the Stuart Age, 1603-1714. John Wroughton, 1997. 
The Longman Companion to Russia Since 1914. Martin McCauley, 1997. 
The Longman Companion to European Decolonisation in the Twentieth Century. Muriel E. Chamberlain, 1998. 
The Longman Companion to the European Reformation, c.1500-1618. Mark Greengrass, 1998. 
The Longman Companion to Germany since 1945. Adrian Webb, 1998. 
The Longman Companion to the Middle East Since 1914. Ritchie Ovendale, 1998. 
The Longman Companion to America, Russia and the Cold War, 1941-1998. John W. Young, 1999. 
The Longman Companion to Britain in the Eighteenth Century, 1688-1820. Jeremy Gregory & John Stevenson, 1999. 
The Longman Companion to Britain in the Nineteenth Century, 1815-1914. Chris Cook, 1999. 
The Longman Companion to the European Union, 1945-99. Alasdair Blair, 1999. 
The Longman Companion to Renaissance Europe, 1390-1530. Stella Fletcher, 1999. 
The Longman Companion to the Labour Party, 1900-98. Harry Harmer, 1999.

2000s
The Longman Companion to the Formation of the European Empires, 1488-1920. Muriel E. Chamberlain, 2000. 
The Longman Companion to Imperial Russia, 1689-1917. David Longley, 2000. 
The Longman Companion to the Conservative Party: Since 1830. Nick Crowson, 2001. 
The Longman Companion to Slavery, Emancipation and Civil Rights. Harry Harmer, 2001. 
The Longman Companion to Central and Eastern Europe Since 1919. Adrian Webb, 2002. 
The Longman Companion to the First World War: Europe, 1914-1918. Colin Nicolson, 2004.

References

Series of history books
Longman books
1993 establishments in the United Kingdom